Siddharth–Garima is an Indian Bollywood screenwriter duo, composed of Siddharth Singh and Garima Wahal. They are best known for their work as the story, screenplay, dialogue, and lyrics writers in Goliyon Ki Raasleela Ram-Leela . Their other notable works include Toilet: Ek Prem Katha , Raabta, Batti Gul Meter Chalu, Kabir Singh and Velle.

References

External links
 IMDB

Hindi cinema